Caravan Pictures, Inc. was an American film production company at Walt Disney Studios, formed by Roger Birnbaum and Joe Roth. Caravan's films were distributed by Buena Vista Pictures Distribution.

While Disney would sign directors and talent to two- and three-picture deals, Caravan would work with talent based on the project being produced and not lock them into agreements. The production company's slate strategy was to commit to screenwriters as directors, put bankable actors in predictable roles, and low-budget movies with like breakthrough talent. The unit had greenlight authority up to $30 million with the expectation of producing 5 to 7 films a year and did not have salary caps. They also did not have its own full business and legal affairs departments, and executives did not have titles until 1997.

History
Caravan Pictures was founded by Roger Birnbaum and Joe Roth as a production company at Disney in 1992 to fill the Disney Studios' then-yearly 50 to 60 production and distribution slots. Caravan was given a five-year, 25-picture agreement with greenlight authority up to $30 million and an overhead budget of $3 million, and was expected to produce 5 to 7 films per year originally. After just releasing its first picture, The Three Musketeers, on Christmas 1993, Caravan expected to release 10 films in 1994, which could accelerate the end of the deal in 2 1/2 years instead of 5 years. They were able to get the adaptation of Angie, I Says that was in turnaround at Fox, where they have previously worked. In 1993, Jonathan Glickman, who came from the USC's Peter Stark Program, joined Caravan as an intern.

When three out of the next four films flopped at the box office, Roth promised to cover I Love Trouble cost overruns pegged at $15 million if it did poorly. It eventually flopped as well.

Roth moved on to be Disney studio chief on August 24, 1994, leaving Birnbaum in charge. Disney CEO Michael Eisner was so set on replacing Jeffrey Katzenberg as Disney studio chief with Roth that he forgave the cost overrun debt and paid Roth $40 million of fees for 21 unproduced films under the deal.

Caravan was restructured in September 1998 to expand production in quantity and television films. Glickman was promoted to president of Caravan at that time, which led Birnbaum to start giving out titles to executives.

In August 1998, Birnbaum left Caravan to co-found Spyglass Entertainment (with Gary Barber, former vice chairman and COO of Morgan Creek Productions) at Roth's prompting, in which Disney took an equity stake and signed a five-year distribution agreement. With Disney cutting its yearly production output, Roth recommended forming a self-financing production firm similar to New Regency Productions. After Caravan's remaining three films were released, the company went inactive. The final production credited to Caravan is the 1999 Disney film Inspector Gadget; on a rather ironic note, if not a brief moment of foreshadowing, the Caravan logo at the end of the film shows the man walking as usual before sprouting a propeller from his hat á la Gadget and flying away offscreen, never to be seen again. Caravan's slate of movie projects and an initial financial advance of $10 million to $20 million against future overages were also contributed by Disney.

List of notable Caravan Pictures films

References

Entertainment companies established in 1992
Mass media companies established in 1992
Mass media companies disestablished in 1999
Defunct American film studios
Walt Disney Studios (division)
Entertainment companies based in California
Film production companies of the United States
Companies based in Santa Monica, California
Defunct companies based in Greater Los Angeles
1992 establishments in California
1999 disestablishments in California
Disney production studios